is a Japanese animation studio. Aside from several stand-alone projects, the studio is well known for producing the Aquarion and Symphogear franchises, as well as later installments of the Macross franchise. The company's Representative Director is Michiaki Satō. Noted anime director and creator Shōji Kawamori is a Special Adviser at the studio. The name Satelight consists of S for Sapporo, A for Animate, T for Technology and E for Entertainment.

History
The studio was founded in late 1995, in Sapporo, Hokkaidō, their first project being Bit the Cupid, the world's first fully digitally-animated television series. In 1996, the studio's next project was producing the CG animation for Group TAC's Īhatōbu Gensō: Kenji no Haru. It soon established a production studio in 1998 in Suginami, Tokyo. The studio soon produced their first television series, Kawamori's Chikyū Shōjo Arjuna, in 2001. In 2006, the studio changed its headquarters from Sapporo to Tokyo.

Works

Television series
Earth Maiden Arjuna (January 9, 2001 – March 27, 2001)
Geneshaft (co-production with Studio Gazelle, April 5, 2001 – June 28, 2001) 
Heat Guy J (October 1, 2002 – March 25, 2003)
Genesis of Aquarion (April 4, 2005 – September 26, 2005)
Noein: To Your Other Self (October 12, 2005 – March 29, 2006)
Glass Fleet (co-production with Gonzo, April 4, 2006 – September 21, 2006)
Koi suru Tenshi Angelique: Kokoro no Mezameru Toki (July 8, 2006 – September 30, 2006)
Galaxy Angel Rune (October 1, 2006 – December 24, 2006)
Koi suru Tenshi Angelique ~ Kagayaki no Ashita ~ (January 5, 2007 – March 23, 2007)
Engage Planet Kiss Dum (April 3, 2007 – September 25, 2007)
Kamichama Karin (April 6, 2007 – September 29, 2007)
Shugo Chara! (October 6, 2007 – September 27, 2008)
Time Jam: Valerian & Laureline (co-production with EuropaCorp and Dargaud) (October 20, 2007 – March 5, 2008)
Macross Frontier (April 4, 2008 – September 26, 2008)
Shugo Chara!! Doki— (October 4, 2008 – September 26, 2009)
Legends of the Dark King: A Fist of the North Star Story (October 10, 2008 – December 25, 2008)
Basquash! (April 3, 2009 – October 1, 2009)
The Guin Saga (April 5, 2009 – September 27, 2009)
Shugo Chara! Party! (October 3, 2009 – March 27, 2010)
Anyamaru Tantei Kiruminzuu (October 5, 2009 – September 20, 2010, co-production with Hal Film Maker (1–11) and JM Animation)
Fairy Tail (October 12, 2009 – March 30, 2013, episodes 1–175, co-production with A-1 Pictures (first series))
Kiddy Girl-and (October 15, 2009 – March 25, 2010)
Croisée in a Foreign Labyrinth (July 4, 2011 – September 19, 2011)
Senki Zesshō Symphogear (with Encourage Films) and Studio Pastoral (#3), January 6, 2012 – March 30, 2012)
Aquarion Evol (co-production with Eight Bit, January 8, 2012 – June 24, 2012)
Bodacious Space Pirates (January 8, 2012 – June 30, 2012)
AKB0048 (April 29, 2012 – July 22, 2012)
Muv-Luv Alternative: Total Eclipse (co-production with ixtl, July 2, 2012 – December 23, 2012)
AKB0048 next stage (January 5, 2013 – March 30, 2013)
Arata: The Legend (April 9, 2013 – July 1, 2013)
Senki Zesshō Symphogear G (July 4, 2013 – September 26, 2013)
Log Horizon (October 5, 2013 – March 22, 2014)
White Album 2 (October 6, 2013 – December 29, 2013)
Nobunaga the Fool (January 5, 2014 – June 22, 2014)
M3: The Dark Metal (co-production with C2C, April 21, 2014 – October 1, 2014)
Lord Marksman and Vanadis (October 4, 2014 – December 27, 2014)
The Disappearance of Nagato Yuki-chan (April 3, 2015 – July 17, 2015)
Aquarion Logos (co-production with C2C, July 2, 2015 – December 24, 2015) 
Senki Zesshō Symphogear GX (July 4, 2015 – September 25, 2015)
Momokuri (December 24, 2015 – February 4, 2016)
Ragnastrike Angels (April 3, 2016 – June 19, 2016)
Macross Delta (April 3, 2016 – September 25, 2016)
Scared Rider Xechs (July 5, 2016 – September 20, 2016)
Nanbaka (October 5, 2016 – March 22, 2017)
WorldEnd (co-production with C2C, April 11, 2017 – June 27, 2017)
Senki Zesshō Symphogear AXZ (July 1, 2017 – September 30, 2017)
Hakata Tonkotsu Ramens (January 12, 2018 – March 30, 2018)
Last Hope (April 4, 2018 – September 26, 2018)
Caligula (April 8, 2018 – June 24, 2018)
Girly Air Force (January 10, 2019 – March 28, 2019)
Senki Zesshō Symphogear XV (July 6, 2019 – September 28, 2019)
Somali and the Forest Spirit (co-production with Hornets, January 9, 2020 – March 26, 2020)
Sakugan (October 7, 2021 – December 23, 2021)
Black Summoner (July 9, 2022 – September 24, 2022)
Rokudo's Bad Girls (April 8, 2023)
Helck (July 2023)
Sōsei no Aquarion: Myth of Emotions (TBA)

OVAs/ONAs
Macross Zero (December 21, 2002 – October 2004)
Hellsing Ultimate (February 10, 2006 – February 22, 2008) (episodes 1–4)
Baldr Force EXE: Resolution (October 11, 2006 – April 4, 2007)
Genesis of Aquarion: Wings of Betrayal (May 25, 2007)
Genesis of Aquarion: Wings of Glory (November 22, 2007)
Air Gear OVAs (November 17, 2010 – June 17, 2011)
100 Sleeping Princes and the Kingdom of Dreams (March 25, 2017 – December 23, 2017)
Final Fantasy XV: Episode Ardyn - Prologue (February 17, 2019)
Cannon Busters (co-production with Yumeta Company, August 15, 2019)

Anime films
Genesis of Aquarion: Wings of Genesis (September 15, 2007)
Macross Frontier the Movie ~Itsuwari no Utahime~ (co-production with Eight Bit, November 21, 2009)
Macross Frontier the Movie ~Sayonara no Tsubasa~ (February 26, 2011)
Macross Delta: Passionate Walküre (February 9, 2018)
For Whom the Alchemist Exists (June 14, 2019)
Macross Delta the Movie: Absolute Live!!!!!! (October 8, 2021)
Star Blazers: Space Battleship Yamato 2205: Zensho -TAKE OFF- (co-production with Staple Entertainment, October 8, 2021)
Star Blazers: Space Battleship Yamato 2205: Kosho -STASHA- (February 4, 2022)

Games
Heavy Metal Thunder (2005, Cell Animation Production)
Persona 2: Innocent Sin (2011, Opening Animation Production)
Devil Summoner: Soul Hackers (2012, Nintendo 3DS Opening Animation Production)
E.X. Troopers (2013, Promotional Anime)
Time and Eternity (2012, 2013 animation movies and characters)
Aquarion Evol (PlayStation VR)
Daemon X Machina (2019, "Order Zero" prologue animation & in-game opening animation production)

Related studios
 Debris Sapporo - A studio founded by former members.
 GoHands - A studio founded by the staff of Satelight's former Osaka branch.
 Eight Bit - A studio founded by former members.

Notes

References

External links
  
 

Satelight
Japanese animation studios
Animation studios in Tokyo
Mass media companies established in 1995
Japanese companies established in 1995
Suginami